The sixth season of Gran Hermano Argentina premiered on Sunday December 12, 2010 hosted by Jorge Rial. For the first two weeks after the premiere, the Gala will be hosted by Marley due to Rial taking a holiday. It began on 12 December 2010, and the prize money for the series is 400,000 Argentine pesos (100,680 USD). The season ended on Sunday May 1, 2011 after lasting 141 days, becoming the longest series ever produced in the Americas. Also, third place, Martín Anchorena became the housemate that has stayed the longest in a Big Brother house in the Americas, at that time, by staying all.

On Day 50, Juan Pablo left the House, since he wanted to go back to his studies and during his stay, he repeatedly announced his intentions of leaving. After Cristian U. walked out of the House on Day 58, a repechage process began on Day 62, and the two housemates that decided to leave voluntarily were also asked to be part of this process. At the end of Day 62's live nominations show, only Juan Pablo decided to stay out of the repechage and evicted housemates Rocío, Ariana, Leandro, Natalí, Christian Y., Emiliano, and Gisele with walkee Cristian U. were put up for public vote to see who will be the two returning, it was announced that Cristian U., Emiliano, Gisele, and Rocío were the elected ones to go back in with the final decision to be revealed on Day 64's live eviction show.

On Day 64 (February 13, 2011) the four finalists of the repechage vote entered the house. Cristian U. and Rocío were the ones originally returning, he obtained 74,37% of all votes while she obtained 9,11% with Gisele and Emiliano obtaining 4,21% and 5,15% respectively. After their re-entrance, Jésica voluntarily left the house alleging she was missing her son.

On Day 127 (April 17, 2011), Solange Gómez became the women that has survived the longest number of days in a BB edition held on the Western Hemisphere by surviving from Day 1 until Day 127 when she was evicted, and this will be the first edition in Argentina in which all finalist are from the same gender, in this case, males.

On Day 141 (May 1, 2011), the final 3, Cristian U., Emiliano and Martín A. all received monetary prizes, Martín A. received 50,000 Argentine pesos, Emiliano received 90,000 Argentine pesos, the amount he received is not the one he was supposed to receive as the runner-up because he spent some days outside the house this also happened to winner Cristian U. that received 382,357 Argentine pesos instead of the original 400,000 Argentine pesos of the prize.

Housemates

For this season, the producers allowed citizens from countries other than Argentina to audition to be on the show. The producers were looking specifically for housemates that were between the ages of 18 and 35.

Nominations Table

Housemates nominate for 2 and 1 Point(s), shown in descending order in the Nomination Box. The two or more Housemates with the most Nomination Points will face the Public Vote.

On the first round of nominations, Gisele and Natalí obtained two extra points in the nominations after one of them told Tamara that they were planning their votes.
On the fourth round of nominations, Natalí's and Solange's votes were nullified after they committed a complot against Gisele and Luz.
For the fifth round of nominations, Alejandro received immunity from being nominated and any vote cast against him will be nullified.
For the fifth round of nominations, Alejandro lost his immunity after some housemates discovered it.
For the fifth round of nominations, Christian Y., Emanuel and Solange's votes were nullified as they broke the rules by taking their microphones out and whispering between them some informations.
For the sixth round of nominations, Emiliano and Solange's votes were nullified as they committed a complot against Gisele and Luz.
For the seventh round of nominations, both Constanza and Jonathan K. won't either vote or be voted, for the following weeks nominations they're available to vote and be voted.
For the ninth round of nominations, Cristian U, Emiliano, Gisele and Rocío as returning housemates, will nominate and can be nominated, but they won't take part in the cards process
From the ninth round of nominations and on, Cristian U, Emiliano, Gisele and Rocío re-gain the chance of using the "fulminant" nomination, which consists of sending another housemate directly to the up for eviction list.
For the tenth of nominations, an Immunity card will be obtained by any housemate that has been inside the House since Day 1.

References

2010 Argentine television seasons
2011 Argentine television seasons
06